Philip Dirk baron van Pallandt, heer van Eerde (28 December 1889 – 1 November 1979) was a Scoutmaster in the early years of Dutch scouting. He was the owner of Gilwell Ada's Hoeve on his Eerde Estate, which he gave to Scouting in 1923.

In 1924, baron Philip van Pallandt deeded the Eerde castle to the Order of the Star in the East, an organization connected to the famous philosopher and spiritual teacher Jiddu Krishnamurti, of whom the baron was an avid follower.

External links
article Philip van Pallandt on Scoutpedia.nl (Dutch)
History of the relation between Krishnamurti and Philip baron van Pallandt and his estate. Includes a walk
De geschiedenis van Kasteel Eerde (Dutch)
The Eerde Estate

Barons of the Netherlands
Scouting pioneers
Scouting and Guiding in the Netherlands
People from The Hague
People from Ommen
Theosophy
1889 births
1979 deaths